Luis Herrera may refer to:

Luis Herrera (cyclist) (born 1961), Colombian cyclist
Luis Herrera (tennis) (born 1971), Mexican tennis player
Luis Herrera Campins (1925–2007), President of Venezuela
Luis Bayón Herrera (1889–1956), Spanish film director
Luis Beder Herrera (born 1951), Argentine politician
Luis Herrera (footballer) (born 1962), Colombian footballer